Beiar Fjord is a fjord in Nordland, Norway. The fjord lies mostly within the municipality of Beiarn, but the westernmost part of the fjord lies in Gildeskål municipality. The Norwegian County Road 17 crosses the fjord near the mouth via the Kjellingstraumen Bridge.

The  Beiar River debouches into the head of Beiar Fjord. The Beiar Fjord splits into several basins at some of the narrow sounds among which the innermost one is the largest. This area is a beautiful spot known to local boaters and tourists.

See also
 List of Norwegian fjords

References

Fjords of Nordland
Beiarn